Jean-Paul Mattei (born 21 March 1954) is a French politician representing the Democratic Movement. He was elected to the French National Assembly on 18 June 2017, representing the department of Pyrénées-Atlantiques.

References

1954 births
Living people
Deputies of the 15th National Assembly of the French Fifth Republic
Democratic Movement (France) politicians
French people of Italian descent
Politicians from Nouvelle-Aquitaine
Deputies of the 16th National Assembly of the French Fifth Republic
Members of Parliament for Pyrénées-Atlantiques